Héctor Bienvenido Ramírez (born December 15, 1971) is a former Major League Baseball pitcher.

Career
On August 22, 1988, Ramírez was signed by the New York Mets as an undrafted free agent. After playing in the minors from 1989 to 1997, Ramírez was traded to the Baltimore Orioles in exchange for Manny Alexander and Scott McClain on March 22, 1997. On January 20, 1998, the New York Yankees claimed Ramírez off waivers from the Orioles, but quickly lost him back on waivers to the Orioles on January 30. On February 4, 1998, Ramírez was traded to the Florida Marlins in exchange for future considerations. On October 15, 1988, he elected free agency and signed with the Milwaukee Brewers on November 20, 1988. He made his major league debut on August 28, 1999. Ramírez was granted free agency on December 21, 1999 and re-signed with the Brewers on January 26, 2000. After a few appearances on the year, Ramírez was released on June 2, 2000. On June 8, 2000, Ramírez signed a minor league contract with the Baltimore Orioles organization. On August 24, 2000, the Orioles released Ramírez and he signed a minor league contract with the Houston Astros the next day. On October 18, 2000, Ramírez elected free agency. In 2002, Ramírez played for the San Angelo Colts of the Central Baseball League. In 2005, Ramírez played for the Sinon Bulls of the Chinese Professional Baseball League and won the Taiwan Series.

Sources

External links

1971 births
Binghamton Mets players
Capital City Bombers players
Charlotte Knights players
Columbia Mets players
Dominican Republic expatriate baseball players in the United States
Gulf Coast Mets players
Kingsport Mets players

Living people
Louisville RiverBats players
Major League Baseball pitchers
Major League Baseball players from the Dominican Republic
Milwaukee Brewers players
New Orleans Zephyrs players
Norfolk Tides players
Rochester Red Wings players
San Angelo Colts players
St. Lucie Mets players
Azucareros del Este players
Dominican Republic expatriate baseball players in Taiwan
Sinon Bulls players
Indianapolis Indians players